Dylan Garand is a Canadian ice hockey goaltender who plays for the Hartford Wolf Pack of the American Hockey League (AHL) as a prospect for the New York Rangers. He was drafted by the Rangers in the fourth round of the 2020 NHL Entry Draft.

Playing career
Entering the Western Hockey League, the 2018–19 season was Garand's first full season with the Kamloops Blazers. Although only 16 years old, he became the team's starting goaltender when Dylan Ferguson was injured and led the team to the WHL playoffs.

In the 2018–19 season, Garand played in 42 games and had a 2.21 goals against average and a .921 save percentage. He won the Daryl K. Seaman Trophy as WHL's Scholastic Player of the Year. After the season he was drafted by the New York Rangers in the 4th round of the 2020 NHL Entry Draft with the 103rd overall selection. 

For the 2020–21 WHL season, Garand played in only 18 games, posting a 2.15 goals against average and a .921 save percentage. Garand also played two games for the Rangers' American Hockey League affiliate, the Hartford Wolf Pack. In two games for Hartford he had a 3.68 goals against average and an .839 save percentage. 

In the 2021–22 season, Garand posted a 2.16 goals against average and a .935 save percentage for Kamloops. As a result, he won the Del Wilson Trophy as the top WHL goaltender and was named a First Team All-Star in the WHL B.C. Division. His goals against average and saves percentage were each second in the WHL. His 34 wins was tied for first in the league among goaltenders, and he also tied for fourth in the league in shutouts, with 4. Garand was considered by some writers to be the best goalie in the entire Canadian Hockey League, and he won the 2021–22 CHL Goaltender of the Year award. Midway through the season Garand signed his first professional contract with the Rangers.

He started the 2022–23 pre-season with the Rangers but was assigned to the Hartford Wolf Pack before the season began.

International play

Garand was named to Team Canada for the 2021 World Junior Ice Hockey Championships. He served as the backup goaltender to Devon Levi, playing one game during the tournament as Canada won a silver medal. He rejoined the team for the 2022 World Junior Ice Hockey Championships, initially scheduled to be played in December 2021 and January 2022. The tournament was cancelled due to the COVID-19 pandemic after Garand had played only one game. However, the tournament resumed in August, with Garand returning as starting goaltender. He played in six of Team Canada's seven games, winning all of them with a 1.98 goals against average as Canada won the gold medal.

Playing style
Garand is considered relatively small for a goaltender at 6 feet, 1 inch.  However, according to Kamloops' goaltender coach Dan De Palma "he moves really well (and) he's an elite tracker of the puck. His head trajectory on the puck is outstanding ... and then from there, when the stress and the chaos ensues, his movement is exceptional, as well." Team Canada goaltender coach Jason LaBarbera similarly said that he's able to make saves with his with his hands really well, and some guys don't have that ability.  Sometimes, even if you’re a 6-foot-5 guy and you don’t have good hands, you can be exposed."  LaBarbera also said that Garand has "got a lot of different aspects to his game. He's very talented in that sense. He’s very good at tracking the puck. He stays down on the puck; he doesn't chase it. He gives himself opportunities to make saves with his positioning and his skating ability."  Garand has said of his height "at end of the day, you've got to stop the puck. If you can do that, then doesn't matter what your height is."  Fellow Ranger prospect and Team Canada teammate Will Cuylle said of Garand "I’ve never seen someone so like focused and dialed in before."

Asked before the 2022–23 season what it would take to become a great goaltender for the Rangers, Garand said "I feel like just sticking to my game — I know what works for me, so kind of continue to build that foundation and that stuff at the next level."

Career statistics

International

References

External links
 

2002 births
Living people
21st-century Canadian people
Canadian ice hockey goaltenders
Hartford Wolf Pack players
Ice hockey people from British Columbia
Kamloops Blazers players
New York Rangers draft picks
Sportspeople from Kamloops